László Sütő (born 18 April 1986 in Szombathely, Hungary) is a Hungarian football (defender) player.

References
HLSZ 
MLSZ 
UEFA

1986 births
Living people
Sportspeople from Szombathely
Hungarian footballers
Association football defenders
MTK Budapest FC players
BFC Siófok players
Pécsi MFC players
Vasas SC players